Givanilton Martins Ferreira (born 13 April 1991), commonly known as Gil, is a Brazilian professional footballer who currently plays as a striker for Hong Kong Premier League club Lee Man.

Club career
Born in Irecê, Gil graduated from the youth setup of Vila Nova and was promoted to the senior team in 2009. After scoring three goals in the season's Série B, he joined Série A side Santos on a loan deal on 17 September 2009. Following a temporary deal with Grêmio Barueri in 2011, he left Vila Nova on 13 December of the same year.

Gil represented Syrian club Al-Jaish and Grêmio Barueri in quick succession in 2012, before joining Bragantino of Série B on 29 June 2012. In the following season, he moved to São Bernardo. On 16 April 2014, he joined Ceará on loan for the remainder of the season.

On 17 June 2015, Gil moved abroad and joined Korean club Gangwon FC. In 2017, he returned to Brazil and signed for Rio Claro. On 18 September, (the last day of the transfer window), he switched to Boa Esporte of Série B.

On 4 January 2018, Gil signed for Korean club Gwangju on a one-year contract.

In January 2019, Gil returned to Brazil with Goianésia, and on 2 April 2019 he was announced as a new signing for Treze to play in 2019 Campeonato Brasileiro Série C. He scored in the opening game of the season on 29 April 2019, against Santa Cruz.

On 19 July 2019, Gil moved to Hong Kong, signing with Lee Man. On 24 May 2020, he re-signed with Lee Man for a further year.

References

External links

1991 births
Living people
Association football forwards
Brazilian footballers
Campeonato Brasileiro Série A players
Campeonato Brasileiro Série B players
Vila Nova Futebol Clube players
Santos FC players
Grêmio Barueri Futebol players
Clube Atlético Bragantino players
São Bernardo Futebol Clube players
Ceará Sporting Club players
Rio Claro Futebol Clube players
Boa Esporte Clube players
Al-Jaish Damascus players
K League 2 players
Gangwon FC players
Gwangju FC players
Goianésia Esporte Clube players
Treze Futebol Clube players
Lee Man FC players
Brazilian expatriate footballers
Expatriate footballers in Syria
Expatriate footballers in South Korea
Brazilian expatriate sportspeople in South Korea
Syrian Premier League players